Elton John is the second studio album by English singer-songwriter Elton John. It was released on 10 April 1970 by DJM Records and by Uni Records in United States. The album was the first release by John in the United States because Empty Sky was not released in the country until 1975.

The album includes John's breakthrough single "Your Song", which reached number 7 in the UK charts and helped to establish his career during what was considered the "singer-songwriter" era of popular music. In the US, it was certified gold in February 1971 by the RIAA. In the same year, it was nominated for the Grammy Award for Album of the Year.

In 2003, the album was ranked number 468 on Rolling Stone magazine's list of the 500 greatest albums of all time. On 27 November 2012, it was inducted into the Grammy Hall of Fame as an album cited as exhibiting "qualitative or historical significance".

Production
This was the first of a string of John albums produced by Gus Dudgeon. As Dudgeon recalled in a Mix magazine interview, the album was not actually intended to launch John as an artist, but rather as a collection of polished demos for other artists to consider recording his and co-writer Bernie Taupin's songs. Two songs from the album did find their way into the repertoire of other artists in 1970: "Your Song" was recorded by Three Dog Night as an album track on their LP It Ain't Easy, while Aretha Franklin released a cover of "Border Song" as a single that reached number 37 in the US pop charts and number 5 on the R&B chart, later included on her 1972 album Young, Gifted and Black.

The song "No Shoe Strings on Louise" was intended (as homage or parody) to sound like a Rolling Stones song.

Reception

John Mendelsohn in a contemporary (1970) review for Rolling Stone felt that the album was over-produced and over-orchestrated, comparing it unfavourably with the less mannered and orchestrated Empty Sky; though he felt that John had "so immense a talent" that "he'll delight you senseless despite it all". Robert Christgau in his weekly  "Consumer Guide" column for The Village Voice also felt the album was overdone ("overweening", "histrionic overload", "semi-classical ponderousness"), but that it had "a surprising complement of memorable tracks", including "Your Song" which, despite its "affected offhandedness", he considered "an instant standard".

Track listing

B-sides

Live recordings
John performed many of these songs live, and included six of these ten songs on his 1987 album Live in Australia with the Melbourne Symphony Orchestra.

Personnel
Track numbers refer to CD and digital releases of the album.
 Elton John – piano, vocals (all tracks), harpsichord (2)
 Diana Lewis – Moog synthesizer (5, 9)
 Brian Dee – organ (6, 7)
 Frank Clark – acoustic guitar (1), double bass (10)
 Colin Green – additional guitar (1, 7), Spanish guitar (6)
 Clive Hicks – twelve-string guitar (1), rhythm guitar (4), guitar (7, 8, 10), acoustic guitar (9)
 Roland Harker – guitar (2)
 Alan Parker – rhythm guitar (3)
 Caleb Quaye – lead guitar (3, 4, 5), additional guitar (9)
 Dave Richmond – bass guitar, double bass (1, 7, 8)
 Alan Weighall – bass guitar (3, 4, 9)
 Les Hurdle – bass guitar (10)
 Barry Morgan – drums (1, 3, 4, 7, 9)
 Terry Cox – drums (8, 10)
 Dennis Lopez – percussion (3, 4)
 Tex Navarra – percussion (9)
 Skaila Kanga – harp (2, 8)
 Paul Buckmaster – cello solo (8), orchestral arrangements and conductor
 David Katz – orchestra contractor
 Madeline Bell – backing vocals (3, 4, 7, 9)
 Tony Burrows – backing vocals (3, 4, 7, 9)
 Roger Cook – backing vocals (3, 4, 7, 9)
 Lesley Duncan – backing vocals (3, 4, 7, 9)
 Kay Garner – backing vocals (3, 4, 7, 9)
 Tony Hazzard – backing vocals (3, 4, 7, 9)
 Barbara Moore – backing vocals, choir leader (7)

Technical
 Gus Dudgeon – producer, liner notes
 Robin Geoffrey Cable – engineer
 Gus Skinas – editing
 Alan Harris – original mastering
 Tony Cousins – remastering
 Ricky Graham – digital transfers
 Greg Penny – surround sound
 Steve Brown – production coordinator
 David Larkham – art direction
 Stowell Stanford – photography
 Jim Goff – artwork
 John Tobler – liner notes

Accolades
Grammy Awards

|-
|  style="width:35px; text-align:center;" rowspan="2"|1971 || rowspan="2"| Elton John || Album of the Year || 
|-
| Best Pop Vocal Performance – Male || 
|-

Charts

Weekly charts

Year-end charts

Certifications

References

External links

1970 albums
Albums arranged by Paul Buckmaster
Albums produced by Gus Dudgeon
Albums recorded at Trident Studios
DJM Records albums
Elton John albums
Uni Records albums